Saburo Nagao (25 August 1910 – 13 December 1943) was a Japanese track and field athlete. He competed in the men's javelin throw at the 1932 Summer Olympics. He was killed during World War II.

References

1910 births
1943 deaths
Sportspeople from Osaka
Japanese male javelin throwers
Olympic male javelin throwers
Olympic athletes of Japan
Athletes (track and field) at the 1932 Summer Olympics
Kansai University alumni
Japanese military personnel killed in World War II
20th-century Japanese people